Ervine is a given name and a surname. Notable people with the name include:

Given name 
 Ervine Metzl (1899–1963), American graphic artist and illustrator best known for his posters and postage stamp designs
 Ervine Mosby (1877–1916), English rugby league footballer

Surname 
Brian Ervine (born 1951), playwright, songwriter and teacher living in Belfast, Northern Ireland
Craig Ervine (born 1985), Zimbabwean international cricketer
Dale Ervine (born 1964), former U.S. soccer midfielder who spent most of his career playing indoor soccer
David Ervine (1953–2007), Northern Irish unionist politician and the leader of the Progressive Unionist Party
Linda Ervine, language rights activist from East Belfast, Northern Ireland
Sean Ervine (born 1982), Zimbabwean cricketer
St. John Greer Ervine (1883–1971), Irish author, writer, critic and dramatist
Marcus Ervine-Andrews (1911–1995), Irish recipient of the Victoria Cross, the highest and most prestigious award for gallantry

See also
 ERV (disambiguation), includes people known as Erv
 Earvin
 Ervin (disambiguation)
 Erving (disambiguation)
 Erwan
 Erwin (disambiguation)
 Irvin
 Irvine (disambiguation)
 Irving (disambiguation)
 Irwin (disambiguation)
 Jervine